"Circo Loco" is a song by Canadian rapper Drake and Atlanta-based rapper 21 Savage from their collaborative studio album Her Loss. It was sent to Italian contemporary hit radio on November 11, 2022, as the lead single from the album. Produced by Boi-1da, Tay Keith and 40, it contains a sample and interpolation of "One More Time" by Daft Punk. The song garnered controversy over a perceived diss toward American rapper Megan Thee Stallion.

Composition
"Circo Loco" features "progressing" chords and "booming" bass in production, backed by the sample. In his verse, Drake first raps about his sex life, and then addresses the shooting of Megan Thee Stallion by Canadian rapper Tory Lanez in 2020, suggesting in his lyrics that she was lying about the incident: "This bitch lie 'bout getting shots, but she still a stallion / She don't even get the joke, but she still smiling". He also raps about ending his feud with Kanye West for their benefit concert performance in support of Larry Hoover and raising awareness on prison reform, claiming that he only did it to appease James Prince, who planned the concert. 21 Savage raps about and threatens his enemies in his verse.

Controversy
The song generated controversy due to Drake's lyrics about Megan Thee Stallion, who responded on Twitter with a series of posts condemning it. Rapper Lil Yachty, a songwriter of "Circo Loco", denied the song was referring to Megan on Instagram Live, saying, "It's not about Megan, it's about women lying about their butt shots, saying it's real when it's fake." On December 23, 2022, Lanez was convicted in a jury trial on three felony charges in respect to the shooting: assault with a semiautomatic handgun, having a loaded and unregistered firearm in a vehicle, and gross negligence in discharging his firearm.

Critical reception
The song received generally negative reviews from music critics, with particular criticism directed toward the sample as well as Drake's lines alluding to Megan Thee Stallion. Alex Swhear of Variety regarded the song "ill-advised in its Daft Punk sample and the perplexing bars that follow, in which Drake appears to make light of the alleged assault of Megan Thee Stallion by Tory Lanez". Marcus Shorter of Consequence wrote, "Taking swipes at Megan Thee Stallion on 'Circo Loco' puts that misogynistic behavior on full display." Matthew Ritchie of HipHopDX commented that the song "feels cheap and soulless", while Paul A. Thompson of Pitchfork described it as having a "hammily stupid Daft Punk flip". Josh Svetz of Paste wrote, "'Circo Loco' has been criticized for the Megan Thee Stallion diss, but its worst crime is butchering Daft Punk's classic 'One More Time'."

Charts

Release history

References

2022 singles
2022 songs
Drake (musician) songs
21 Savage songs
Songs written by Drake (musician)
Songs written by 21 Savage
Songs written by Boi-1da
Songs written by Tay Keith
Songs written by 40 (record producer)
Songs written by Lil Yachty
Songs written by Thomas Bangalter
Songs written by Guy-Manuel de Homem-Christo
Song recordings produced by Boi-1da
Song recordings produced by Tay Keith
Song recordings produced by 40 (record producer)
OVO Sound singles
Republic Records singles
Diss tracks